Ross and Cromarty was a county constituency of the House of Commons of the UK Parliament from 1832 to 1983. It elected one Member of Parliament (MP) using the first-past-the-post voting system.

When created in 1832 by the Scottish Reform Act 1832 it combined in one seat the former seats Ross-shire and Cromartyshire.

In 1918 Lewis (a large island several miles offshore) was taken from the seat and merged into the then new Western Isles constituency, and the Fortrose component of the former Inverness Burghs constituency and the Dingwall and Cromarty components of the former Northern Burghs constituency were merged into the Ross and Cromarty constituency.

In 1983 the remaining area of the seat was merged with the Isle of Skye and Isle of Raasay areas of the then-Inverness seat to form Ross, Cromarty and Skye.

Local government areas 

1890 to 1918

County councils were created in Scotland in 1890, and so the constituency area became also the county council area of Ross and Cromarty, minus the Fortrose, Dingwall and Cromarty parliamentary burghs.

1918 to 1975

When reformed in 1918 the constituency covered the county of Ross and Cromarty (including the former parliamentary burghs) minus Lewis.

1975 to 1983

County councils were abolished in 1975 and replaced with regions and districts and island council areas. The constituency area was then that of the district of Ross and Cromarty plus the Lochalsh area of Skye and Lochalsh. Both districts were within the Highland region.

See also

 Counties of Scotland
 Regions and districts of Scotland

Members of Parliament

Election results

Elections in the 1830s

Stewart-Mackenzie resigned after being appointed as Governor Ceylon, causing a by-election.

Elections in the 1840s

Elections in the 1850s

Elections in the 1860s

Elections in the 1870s

Elections in the 1880s

Matheson's resignation caused a by-election.

Elections in the 1890s

Elections in the 1900s

Elections in the 1910s

General Election 1914–15:

Another General Election was required to take place before the end of 1915. The political parties had been making preparations for an election to take place and by the July 1914, the following candidates had been selected; 
Liberal: Ian Macpherson
Unionist:  MacLeod

Elections in the 1920s

Elections in the 1930s

Elections in the 1940s
General Election 1939–40

Another General Election was required to take place before the end of 1940. The political parties had been making preparations for an election to take place and by the Autumn of 1939, the following candidates had been selected; 
National Labour: Malcolm MacDonald
Labour: Malcolm MacEwen

Elections in the 1950s

Elections in the 1960s

Elections in the 1970s

References 

Historic parliamentary constituencies in Scotland (Westminster)
Politics of the county of Cromarty
Politics of the county of Ross
Politics of the county of Ross and Cromarty
Highland constituencies, UK Parliament (historic)
Ross and Cromarty
Constituencies of the Parliament of the United Kingdom disestablished in 1983
Constituencies of the Parliament of the United Kingdom established in 1832